The Ifo Institute for Economic Research is a Munich-based research institution. Ifo is an acronym from Information and Forschung (research). As one of Germany's largest economic think-tanks, it analyses economic policy and is widely known for its monthly Ifo Business Climate Index for Germany. Its research output is significant: about a quarter of the articles published by German research institutes in international journals in economics in 2006 were from Ifo researchers. The Frankfurter Allgemeine Zeitung ranks it as Germany's most influential economics research institute.

Ifo Business Climate Index
Ifo's Business Climate Index is a leading early indicator of economic activity released monthly since 1972. The database underlying the index is a monthly survey of 7000 in the construction, manufacturing, wholesale and retail industries. The index is closely followed by investors, commentators and politics.

Report on the German economy
The Ifo Institute participates in the twice yearly (spring and autumn) joint analysis of the state of the German and world economy, the so-called Gemeinschaftsdiagnose.

References

External links 
 Ifo Website (German or English)

Economic research institutes
Leibniz Association
Non-profit organisations based in Bavaria
Political and economic think tanks based in Germany
Research institutes in Munich